Everton Park is a suburb of the City of Brisbane, Queensland, Australia.

Geography 
Everton Park is about eight kilometres north of the Brisbane CBD. It is predominantly residential, with more than a quarter of the population residing in semi-detached and higher-density dwellings.

History 
The suburb takes its name from the Everton Park Estate subdivision. Everton was the name of the residence of pioneer settlers William James McDowall and Ambrose McDowall, which was named after Everton, a suburb of Liverpool, England.

In the 1890s, the town of Bunyaville was located north of South Pine Road in the present-day suburbs of Everton Hills and Everton Park. Until 1891, it was known as Kedron after Kedron Brook which flows through the area.

Bunyaville Baptist Church opened on Saturday 2 July 1932. It was on Timms Road (now in Everton Hills) on land donated by Arthur Timms with some financial assistance from the Newmarket Baptist Church. It was built "in a day" on Saturday 4 June 1932.

Bunyaville State School opened on 18 June 1934. In 1954 it was renamed Everton Park State School.

Everton Park State High School opened on 23 January 1961 (but it was originally intended to be called Stafford State High School).

The Everton Park Library opened in 1965.

St Jude's Anglican Church at 27 Mcilwraith Street was dedicated in 1978 by Archbishop Felix Arnott. Its closure circa 2012 was approved by Archbishop Phillip Aspinall. The Brisbane Brass Music Association now occupy the church building.

Prince of Peace Lutheran College opened on 3 January 1984.

Northside Christian College opened on 28 January 1985.

In the  the population of Everton Park was 8,325 people, 51.2% female and 48.8% male. The median age of the Everton Park population was 37 years of age, the same as the national median. 77.5% of people living in Everton Park were born in Australia, compared to the national average of 69.8%; the next-most-common countries of birth were England 2.7%, New Zealand 2.4%, India 1.1%, Italy 0.9%, Scotland 0.8%. 85.9% of people spoke only English at home; the next-most-spoken languages were 1.6% Italian, 0.6% Cantonese, 0.5% German, 0.5% Mandarin, 0.4% Hindi.

Education 
Everton Park State School is a government primary (Prep-6) school for boys and girls at Deakin Street. In 2017, the school had an enrolment of 497 students with 38 teachers (35 full-time equivalent) and 25 non-teaching staff (14 full-time equivalent). It includes a special education program.

Everton Park State High School is a government secondary (7-12) school for boys and girls at 668 Stafford Road. In 2017, the school had an enrolment of 293 students with 34 teachers (30 full-time equivalent) and 26 non-teaching staff (16 full-time equivalent). It includes a special education program.

Prince of Peace Lutheran College is a private primary (Prep-6) school for boys and girls at 20 Rogers Parade West. It has its secondary campus in Everton Hills. In 2017, the school had an enrolment of 761 students with 63 teachers (53 full-time equivalent) and 70 non-teaching staff (33 full-time equivalent).

Northside Christian College is a private primary and secondary (Prep-12) school for boys and girls at 151 Flockton Street. In 2017, the school had an enrolment of 1,136 students with 102 teachers (87 full-time equivalent) and 93 non-teaching staff (55 full-time equivalent).

Transport 
South Pine Road and Old Northern Road are both major transport corridors that run through the suburb towards Brisbane. They are serviced by several Brisbane Transport bus services. Many commuters also drive or cycle to nearby railway stations at Gaythorne, Mitchelton and Oxford Park. There are also many local bikeways.

The Qld Department of Transport and Main Roads plans to provide new transit lanes on Stafford Road between Everton Park and Kedron and a new bikeway that would provide a direct east–west route along Stafford Road, between Everton Park and Kedron. The overall plan is to improve east–west capacity, connecting the north-western suburbs with the Australian TradeCoast.

Amenities 
Nearby Mitchelton, contains Brookside Shopping Centre, the major retail centre of the area; however, several retail services are available along South Pine Road, including the North-West Homemaker Centre, which includes the only Spotlight and Harvey Norman in the north-west district. A community-based shopping centre with a Coles supermarket and specialty stores is also located at the intersection of South Pine and Stafford Roads.

The Brisbane City Council operates the Everton Park public library at 561 South Pine Road.

Everton Park is a Neighbourhood Watch area.

Political representatives 
Tim Mander is the current sitting member of the Legislative Assembly of Queensland for Everton, having been elected at the 2012 Queensland state election by defeating Labor's Murray Watt (the Parliamentary Secretary to the Treasurer).

References

Further reading

External links